Rachael Morrison (born June 2, 1987) is an American Paralympic athlete. She competes in the discus throw and club throw and holds world records in both events. She won the discus throw at the 2015 World Championships, 2015 Parapan American Games and 2016 Paralympics.

Morrison was an active able-bodied athlete before becoming quadriplegic in 2010 due to transverse myelitis, a rare condition that damages the spinal cord. After that she played wheelchair basketball and rugby before changing to athletics in 2014.

References

External links 
 
 

1987 births
Living people
American female discus throwers
Paralympic track and field athletes of the United States
Athletes (track and field) at the 2016 Summer Paralympics
Paralympic gold medalists for the United States
Medalists at the 2016 Summer Paralympics
People from Royal Oak, Michigan
Track and field athletes from Michigan
Paralympic medalists in athletics (track and field)
Medalists at the 2015 Parapan American Games
21st-century American women
Wheelchair discus throwers
Club throwers
Paralympic discus throwers
Paralympic shot putters